North County was a county of the extralegal United States Territory of Jefferson that existed from November 28, 1859, until February 28, 1861.

History
In July 1858, gold was discovered along the South Platte River in Arapahoe County, Kansas Territory.  This discovery precipitated the Pike's Peak Gold Rush.  Many residents of the mining region felt disconnected from the remote territorial governments of Kansas and Nebraska, so they voted to form their own Territory of Jefferson on October 24, 1859.  On November 28, the General Assembly of the Territory of Jefferson organized 12 counties:  Arrappahoe County, Cheyenne County, El Paso County, Fountain County, Heele County, Jackson County, Jefferson County, Mountain County, North County, Park County, Saratoga County, and St. Vrain's County.  The legislation that created North County declared:

That the territory comprised within the limits of what is known as the North Park, be erected into a county to be called North county.

North County was named for North Park and encompassed what is today Jackson County, Colorado.

The Jefferson Territory never received federal sanction, but on February 28, 1861, U.S. President James Buchanan signed an act organizing the Territory of Colorado.  On November 1, 1861, the Colorado General Assembly organized 17 counties for the new Colorado Territory.

See also

Outline of Colorado
Index of Colorado-related articles
Historic Colorado counties
History of Colorado
Jackson County, Colorado
Pike's Peak Gold Rush
State of Colorado
Territory of Colorado
Territory of Jefferson

References

External links
Colorado State Historical Society website

Jefferson Territory
Geography of Colorado
History of Colorado
Jackson County, Colorado
1859 establishments in Utah Territory